Reports of cases in the Court of Exchequer, from E.T. 32, Geo. III., to T.T. 37, Geo. III. is the title of a collection of nominate reports, by Alexander Anstruther, of cases decided by the Court of Exchequer Chamber and the House of Lords between approximately 1792 and 1797. For the purpose of citation their name may be abbreviated to "Anst". They are in three volumes. They are reprinted in volume 145 of the English Reports.

J. G. Marvin said:

References
Anstruther, A. Reports of cases in the Court of Exchequer, from E.T. 32, Geo. III., to T.T. 37, Geo. III., 1796–97. 2d ed. 3 vols. 8vo. London. 1817.

External links
Anstruther, A. Reports of cases in the Court of Exchequer, from Easter Term 32 George III. to Trinity Term 33 George III, both inclusive. London. 1796. Vol 1.

Sets of reports reprinted in the English Reports
Court of Exchequer Chamber cases